James Elmer Spyglass (November 1, 1877 - February 16, 1957) was a singer and worked for the US consulate in Frankfurt.

Life and career
He was born in Springfield, Ohio. In 1897 he became a founding member of St. John's Missionary Baptist Church in Springfield. After that, he dedicated his life to music and became a cabaret singer. He was chorus director at Bethel A. M. E. Church in Pittsburgh until 1901. He was a baritone vocalist and in 1905, he graduated from the Toledo Conservatory of Music. He also attended Western Pennsylvania University. At the Carnegie Music Hall in Pittsburgh, Pennsylvania, he accompanied a 25 piece orchestra and a 200-member choir in singing Strauss's "An der schönen blauen Donau".

In 1906, he went to Europe and established himself as an interpreter of "Negro Spirituals". For 20 years, he sang in the Netherlands to cheering audiences. In 1930, he retired to Sachsenhausen, a suburb of Frankfurt am Main, Germany. His house in Sachsenhausen was bombed in 1944. and he moved to Schwalbach.

After World War II, Spyglass became an interpreter and receptionist in the US consulate in Frankfurt. His job was to greet visitors to the consulate—many of them intending to become emigrants to the US—and to direct them to the appropriate office. Spyglass was fluent in five European languages. In Sachsenhausen he opened up language classes and taught English to local townspeople for a number of years.

In 1947, he had an interview with Will Lang Jr. of Life to discuss his life and his role as a receptionist. According to Lang, Spyglass's "pleasant coffee-colored face" greeted everyone who came "to do business with the US." Lang mentions that the consul general, Sidney B. Redecker, was one of the few people who addressed the "colored man" by his first name, Elmer. "To others he is known respectfully as 'Mr Spyglass.'" Will Lang's article appeared in Life on November 3, 1947.

On November 9, 1954, Spyglass became an honorary citizen of Schwalbach, Germany. Spyglass died February 16, 1957. His ashes were returned to Yellow Springs, Ohio where he was buried beside his parents.

Spyglass Prize
On January 8, 1995, a student in Schwalbach was the first to receive the "James Elmer Spyglass Prize" for contributions to intercultural relations.

References

Bibliography

1877 births
1957 deaths
American diplomats
People from Springfield, Ohio
American baritones
20th-century African-American male singers